The 2020 Arizona Wildcats baseball team represented the University of Arizona during the 2020 NCAA Division I baseball season. The Wildcats played their home games for the 9th season at Hi Corbett Field. The team was coached by Jay Johnson in his 5th season at Arizona. This also marked the program's first season with Nate Yeskie as associate head coach. Yeskie was hired away from Oregon State during the offseason to replace Sergio Brown who departed to assume the role of associate head coach at Cal State Fullerton. The season was cancelled on March 12, due to the COVID-19 pandemic.

Personnel

Roster

Coaches

Opening day

Schedule and results

2020 MLB draft

References 

Arizona
Arizona Wildcats baseball seasons
Arizona baseball